The Albany Democrat-Herald is a daily newspaper published in Albany, Oregon, United States. The paper is owned by the Iowa-based Lee Enterprises, a firm which also owns the daily Corvallis Gazette-Times, published in the adjacent market of Corvallis, Oregon, as well as two weeklies, the Lebanon Express and the Philomath Express. The two daily papers publish a joint Sunday edition, called Mid-Valley Sunday.

The Democrat-Herald covers the cities of Albany, Lebanon, and Sweet Home, Oregon, as well as the towns of Jefferson, Halsey, Tangent, Harrisburg, Brownsville, and Shedd.

Publication history

Forerunners

The first newspaper published in Albany, Oregon, county seat of Linn County, was the Oregon Democrat, launched by US Senator Delazon Smith on November 1, 1859. A dedicated supporter of the pro-slavery Democratic Party, Smith's publication was largely devoted to fierce partisan polemics with the editor of the rival Republican publication, the Oregon Statesman, published by the indefatigable Asahel Bush in the nearby city of Salem.

Founding publisher Smith died in November 1860, on the eve of the American Civil War. The Oregon Democrat was carried forward by a new publisher, Pat Malone, but the Confederate-sympathizing weekly ran into trouble with the Republican keepers of the postal system and on April 30, 1862, the paper was banned from the US Mail for its political line. Editor Malone attempted to avoid the postal ban with a remade publication called the Albany Inquirer, but that paper was likewise banned from the mails, thereby effectively terminating the publication.

Origins

It was not until the summer of 1865 that a Democratic newspaper was able to be reestablished in Albany. This was a weekly called the State Rights Democrat, launched on August 1, 1865, by publisher James O'Meara. It is this publication — issued continuously from 1865 into the 21st Century — to which the Albany Democrat-Herald itself traces its roots.

The State Rights Democrat existed as a weekly publication for 17 years, until the paper was sold in 1882 to a new publisher, Fred Nutting, who placed his mark on the broadsheet with a new title, the Albany Weekly Democrat. This name remained in place for six years, until the 1888 move of the paper from a weekly to a daily publication schedule, with the paper becoming the Albany Democrat effective with the change.

In 1879, a rival Republican newspaper was launched in Albany by William Gladstone Steel, the Albany Herald. The dual partisan newspapers battled for market share for nearly half a century until on February 24, 1925, the dominant Albany Democrat absorbed its younger rival. For about six weeks the title Albany Democrat & Albany Herald was clumsily used, with a change made to the current moniker, Albany Democrat-Herald, in the middle of April 1925.

Ownership changes

The Democrat-Herald was privately owned by individuals for most of the 20th Century. In 1919 the Albany Democrat had been purchased by local school superintendent William L. Jackson and his business partner, Ralph Cronise. It would be this pair who owned the merged publication from its establishment in 1925, with ownership passing to William Jackson's son, Grant Jackson, following his father's death.

Late in the 1970s, the Democrat-Herald moved from individual to corporate ownership, when media giant Capital Cities purchased the paper from Grant Jackson's heirs. So-called CapCities would purchase the American Broadcast Company (ABC) in 1985, only to themselves be acquired in 1996 by the Walt Disney Company. Disney immediately began to divest itself of the newspapers acquired in the merger, with the Democrat-Herald sold to Lee Enterprises of Davenport, Iowa in 1998 — a media company which already owned the Corvallis Gazette-Times, located approximately 10 miles away.

Schedule and circulation

Having always been an afternoon newspaper on weekdays with a delivery deadline of 5:30 P.M., on October 4, 2010, it became a morning paper every day with a deadline of 6:30 A.M. on weekdays and 7:00 A.M. on weekends.

As of 2016, the Democrat-Herald has a daily circulation of about 7,500. The combined Sunday edition has a circulation of approximately 8000.

Footnotes

Further reading 

 Robert J. Chandler, "Crushing Dissent: The Pacific Coast Tests Lincoln's Policy of Suppression, 1862," Civil War History, vol. 30 (September 1984), pp. 235–254.
 Floyd J. McKay, "Albany Democrat-Herald," The Oregon Encyclopedia, Oregon Historical Society.
 George Turnbull, History of Oregon Newspapers. Portland, OR: Binfords & Mort, 1939.

External links 
 

Publications established in 1865
1865 establishments in Oregon
Newspapers published in Oregon
Lee Enterprises publications
Companies based in Albany, Oregon
Oregon Newspaper Publishers Association
Daily newspapers published in the United States